The 2015–16 FEI Show Jumping World Cup is an annual international competition among the upper level of show jumping horses and riders for the 2015–16 season in Western Europe. The Final was held in Göteborg, Sweden, from Wednesday 23rd – Monday 28th, March, 2016.

Longines FEI World Cup Jumping Western European League Qualifiers

Results 

Show Jumping World Cup
2015 in show jumping
2016 in show jumping